Dracaenura stenosoma is a moth in the family Crambidae. It was described by Cajetan Felder, Rudolf Felder and Alois Friedrich Rogenhofer in 1875. It is found on Fiji.

References

Moths described in 1875
Spilomelinae